Giersleben is a municipality in the district of Salzlandkreis, in Saxony-Anhalt, Germany.

References

Salzlandkreis